Phaegorista is a genus of moths in the family Erebidae erected by Jean Baptiste Boisduval in 1836.

Species
 Phaegorista agaristoides Boisduval, [1836]
 Phaegorista bicurvata Gaede, 1926
 Phaegorista bisignibasis Prout, 1918
 Phaegorista enarges Tams, 1930
 Phaegorista formosa Butler, 1877
 Phaegorista leucomelas (Herrich-Schäffer, [1855])
 Phaegorista prouti Joicey & Talbot, 1921
 Phaegorista rubriventris Aurivillius, 1925
 Phaegorista similis Walker, 1869
 Phaegorista trialbata Prout, 1918
 Phaegorista xanthosoma Hampson, 1910
 Phaegorista zebra Butler, 1897

References

Aganainae
Moth genera